Anthocercis viscosa, also known as sticky tailflower, is a species of shrub in the family Solanaceae, native to the south coast of Western Australia. It grows up to 3 metres in height and produces white or cream flowers between May and February (late autumn to late summer) in its native range.

Taxonomy
The species was first formally described by botanist Robert Brown in 1810 in Prodromus Florae Novae Hollandiae. Two subspecies are currently recognised:
Anthocercis viscosa subsp. caudata Haegi 
Anthocercis viscosa R.Br. subsp. viscosa

References

Nicotianoideae
Solanales of Australia
Eudicots of Western Australia
Plants described in 1810